Mark Merlis (March 9, 1950 – August 15, 2017) was an American writer and health policy analyst.

Born in Framingham, Massachusetts and raised in Baltimore, Maryland, Merlis attended Wesleyan University and Brown University. He subsequently took a job with the Maryland Department of Health to support himself while writing. In 1987, he took a job with the Congressional Research Service at the Library of Congress as a social legislation specialist, and was involved in the creation of the Ryan White Care Act.

Beginning in the 1990s, Merlis published a series of novels. His first novel, American Studies, was published in 1994 and won the Ferro-Grumley Award for LGBT Literature and the Los Angeles Times Book Prize Art Seidenbaum Award for First Fiction in 1995, and his second, An Arrow's Flight, was published in 1998 and won the 1999 Lambda Literary Award for Gay Fiction. He published two further novels during his lifetime, Man About Town in 2003 and JD in 2015.

Merlis lived in Philadelphia, Pennsylvania, and worked both as an author and an independent health policy consultant.

He died on August 15, 2017, at the Pennsylvania Hospital in Philadelphia, from pneumonia associated with ALS. He was 67 years old. He is survived by his husband of many years, Robert Ashe.

Works
American Studies (1994)
An Arrow's Flight (1998) - also published as Pyrrhus (1999)
Man About Town (2003)
JD (2015)

References

External links
Mark Merlis

1950 births
2017 deaths
20th-century American novelists
21st-century American novelists
American male novelists
American gay writers
Lambda Literary Award for Gay Fiction winners
People from Framingham, Massachusetts
Writers from Baltimore
Novelists from Massachusetts
American LGBT novelists
20th-century American male writers
21st-century American male writers
Novelists from Maryland
LGBT people from Massachusetts